Paulohi is a nearly extinct Austronesian language spoken on Seram Island in eastern Indonesia.

References

Central Maluku languages
Languages of Indonesia
Seram Island